Monnerville is a commune in the Essonne department in Île-de-France in northern France. Monnerville station has rail connections to Orléans, Étampes and Paris.

Inhabitants of Monnerville are known as Monnervillois.

See also
 Communes of the Essonne department

References

External links

Mayors of Essonne Association 

Communes of Essonne